Herzogin Cecilie was a German-built four-mast barque (windjammer), named after German Crown Princess Duchess Cecilie of Mecklenburg-Schwerin (1886–1954), spouse of Crown Prince Wilhelm of Prussia (1882–1951) (Herzogin being German for Duchess). She sailed under German, French and Finnish flags.

History 
Herzogin Cecilie was built in 1902 by Rickmers Schiffbau AG in Bremerhaven. She was yard number 122 and was launched on 22 April 1902. Completion was on 7 June that year. Herzogin Cecilie was built for Norddeutscher Lloyd Bremen. Unlike other contemporary German merchant sailing ships, the black Flying-P-Liners or the green ships of Rickmers, she was painted in white. She was one of the fastest windjammers ever built: she logged 21 knots at Skagen.

The tall ships of the time remained competitive against the steamers only on the longer trade routes: the Chilean nitrate trade, carrying saltpeter from Chile to Europe, and the Australian wheat trade, carrying grain from Australia to Europe. Both routes required rounding Cape Horn routinely, and were not well suited for steamers, as coal was in short supply there.

Herzogin Cecilie was one of the fastest merchant sailing ships of her time, on a par with the Flying-P-Liners. The trip around Cape Horn from Portland (Oregon) to The Lizard (England) was done in 1903 in only 106 days.

At the outbreak of World War I, she was interned by Chile, returning to Germany in 1920, only to be given to France as reparation, and subsequently sold to Gustaf Erikson (24 October 1872 – 15 August 1947) of Finland for £4250. She was homeported at Mariehamn.

As the freight rates for saltpeter had dropped after the war, Gustaf Erikson sent her to bring grain from Australia. In so-called grain races, several tall ships tried to arrive first in Europe, to sell their cargo for a higher price, as told, for example, in The Great Tea Race of 1866 or The Last Grain Race. Typically, ships were loaded in the Spencer Gulf area, Port Victoria, South Australia, or Wallaroo, South Australia, and travelled to Europe, with ports on the British Isles like Queenstown, Ireland, or Falmouth, Cornwall, being considered as the finish. The ship also passed by Queensland where she was photographed.

After "winning"  four times prior to 1921, she again won the grain race four times in eleven trips from 1926 to 1936.

In 1927, Herzogin Cecilie covered Port Lincoln (South Australia) to Falmouth, London, and won a race against the Swedish ship Beatrice. Alan Villiers was on board, which would result in his book Falmouth for Orders, and later a trip aboard the barque Parma.

With Sven Erikson as her captain and Elis Karlsson her first mate, the ship left Port Lincoln in South Australia on 21 January 1935, with a cargo of wheat, and after taking a more southerly route than usual, reached Falmouth for Orders on 18 May, making her passage of 86 days the second fastest ever. Herzogin Cecilie was making for Ipswich in dense fog, when, on 25 April 1936, she grounded on Ham Stone Rock and drifted onto the cliffs of Bolt Head on the south Devon coast. After parts of the cargo were unloaded, she was floating again, only to be towed in June 1936 to Starhole (Starehole) Bay at the mouth of the nearby Kingsbridge Estuary near Salcombe, and beached there. On 18 January 1939, the ship capsized and sank.

The timber and brass portholes from the chart room were salvaged and used to construct a small room in the Cottage Hotel at Hope Cove, which can still be visited today. The room contains several photographs and press cuttings of the wreck. There is also a collection of items from the ship in a small museum at Sven Eriksson's family home at Pellas, in Lemland, on the Åland Islands of Finland. By far the best relic of the vessel is the beautifully restored captain's saloon, which the owner salvaged before the ship was abandoned and was finally installed in the Åland Maritime Museum in Mariehamn, Finland.

The ship and her last voyage were memorialized in a folk song by Ken Stephens, Herzogin Cecile.

Official numbers and code letters
Official Numbers were a forerunner to IMO Numbers. Herzogin Cecilie had the Finnish Official Number 703 and used the Code Letters TPMK.

See also 
Grain race

References

Sources
 Peter Pedersen and Joseph Conrad (1989). Strandung und Schiffbruch. Mit Entscheidungen der Seeämter des Deutschen Reiches. Bechtemünz Verlag: Augsburg. 
 Fred Schmidt and Dietrich Reimer (1942). Schiffe und Schicksale. Andrews & Steiner: Berlin.
Clamp, Arthur L., The Loss of the Herzogin Cecilie on Ham Stone 25th, Plymouth
Colton, J. Ferrell, Loss of the "Herzogin Cecilie", Sea Breezes Vol. 65 No. 536, August 1990 p. 586
Cormack, Neil W., Herzogin Cecilie, The Flagship of the Gustaf Erikson Fleet of Mariehamn: 1921–1936, N.W. Cormack 1996, 
Cresswell, John P., The Loss of the Herzogin Cecilie, Artscape, Cornwall 1994
Darch, Malcolm, Herzogin Cecilie, the story of her charthouse 1936–1988. Ålands Sjöfart & Handel 5/88 s. 272–273
Lindfors, Harald, Round The Horn in the Herzogin Cecilie in 1922, Ålands Sjöfart 2/76 s. 56–59
McNeill, Robert B., Beatrice vs. Herzogin Cecilie, A most Curious "Race Round the Horn", New York 2001,	Exxon Mobil Marine Lubricants. Volume LXXI, No. 1, 2001, of The Compass, The Magazine of the Sea. 32 PP with b/w and colour illustrations.
Tod, Giles M.S., Herzogin Cecilie gets in a "Breeze", Sea Breezes Vol. XIX. No. 189 August 1935
Alan Villiers, Falmouth for Orders. The Story of the Last Clipper Ship Race around Cape Horn, Geoffrey Bles, London 1929
Alan Villiers, The Cape Horn Grain-ship Race, Washington. 1933, National Geographic Magazine. Extract from: volume LXIII, No.1, January 1933.39 pp., with 38 b/w photos (13 on full page).
Alan Villiers, Last of Windships
Pamela Eriksson, The Duchess. (1958), Secker and Warburg, London.
Pamela Bourne, Out of The World. (1935), Geoffrey Bles, London.
Elis Karlsson, Pully Haul
Elis Karlsson, Mother Sea. (1964) Oxford University Press, London.
W.L. Leclercq, Wind in de Zeilen
Elisabeth Rogge-Ballehr, Schule der See Viermastbark Herzogin Cecilie
W.L.A. Derby, The Tall Ships Pass
Basil Greenhill and John Hackmann, Herzogin Cecilie. (1991), Conway Maritime Press Ltd, London.
Harold A. Underhill, Sail Training and Cadet Ships

External links 

Photo of Herzogin Cecilie in dock
 Herzogin Cecilie
 The grain races
 Wreck history and dive report: Herzogin Cecilie

1902 ships
Barques
Windjammers
Tall ships of Germany
Tall ships of France
Tall ships of Finland
World War I merchant ships of Germany
Merchant ships of France
Merchant ships of Finland
Four-masted ships
Grain ships
Ships built in Bremen (state)
Wreck diving sites in the United Kingdom
Maritime incidents in 1936